Arne Nilsen (21 January 1924 – 16 April 2020) was a Norwegian politician for the Labour Party. He was Minister of Local Government from 1978 to 1979, as well as Minister of Social Affairs from 1979 to 1981. He was also President of the Odelsting from 1981–1985.

He died in April 2020 at the age of 96.

References

1924 births
2020 deaths
Ministers of Local Government and Modernisation of Norway
Members of the Storting
Labour Party (Norway) politicians
20th-century Norwegian politicians